The 2022 Primus Classic (also known as the Grand Prix Impanis-Van Petegem) was the 24th edition of the Primus Classic road cycling one day race, which was held on 17 September 2022 as part of the 2022 UCI ProSeries calendar.

Teams 
13 of the 19 UCI WorldTeams, six UCI ProTeams, and three UCI Continental teams made up the 22 teams that participated in the race.

UCI WorldTeams

 
 
 
 
 
 
 
 
 
 
 
 
 

UCI ProTeams

 
 
 
 
 
 

UCI Continental Teams

Result

References

Sources

External links 
 

Primus Classic
Primus Classic
Primus Classic
Primus Classic